Savenaca Aria (30 April 1964 – 15 March 2020) was a Fijian rugby union footballer and later a coach. He played as a centre.

Career
As player, he played as outside centre for Nawaka. In 1986 he played for Queensland in the Australian Provincial Championship.
Aria's first cap for Fiji was during a match against Wales, at Suva, on May 31, 1986. Despite not being part of the 1987 Rugby World Cup roster, four years later, he was called in the 1991 Rugby World Cup roster, playing two matches in the tournament. His last international cap was during a match against Japan, at Ehime, on May 8, 1994. In addition, he also played rugby sevens for the Nadi provincial team in the Fijian championship and played in the Hong Kong Sevens in 1987 and 1988 for the Fiji national team..

Coaching career
Aria coached Nadi in 2001 and, a year later, in 2002, he became the assistant coach for Sanivalati Laulau in the Fiji national rugby union team. In 2009, he led the Fiji Police team, which won the Ratu Sukuna Cup, defeating the Fiji Armed Forces team (the team's fifth consecutive victory). He had the rank of police sergeant. He also served as President of the Blue Football Club, which participated in the championship of the Nadi province.

Death

Aria died on 15 March 2020, at his residence in Nawaka, Nadi, aged 55. He is survived by his wife Seru, five children and four grandchildren

Notes

External links

Photo and Info teivovo.com

1964 births
2020 deaths
Fijian expatriates in Japan
Fiji international rugby union players
Fijian rugby union coaches
Fijian rugby union players
I-Taukei Fijian people
Rugby union centres
Sportspeople from Nadi
Fijian expatriates in Australia